= George A. Romero bibliography =

A list of books and essays about George A. Romero:

- Ryall, Chris; Romero, George A. (2006). George A. Romero's Land of the Dead. IDW. ISBN 978-1-933239-74-3.
- Paffenroth, Kim (2006). Gospel of the Living Dead: George Romero's Visions of Hell on Earth. Baylor University Press. ISBN 978-1-932792-65-2.
- Wetmore, Jr., Kevin J. (13 June 2011). Back from the Dead: Remakes of the Romero Zombie Films as Markers of Their Times. McFarland. ISBN 978-0-7864-4642-1.
- Williams, Tony (2011). George A. Romero: Interviews. Univ. Press of Mississippi. ISBN 978-1-61703-027-7.
- Williams, Tony (13 August 2013). The Cinema of George A. Romero: Knight of the Living Dead. Columbia University Press. ISBN 978-0-231-85030-8.
- Stephen King's Creepshow: A George A. Romero Film. New American Library. 1982. ISBN 978-0-452-25380-3.

== Individual films ==
Dawn of the Dead

- George A. Romero's Dawn of the Dead. Idea & Design Works, LLC. 6 October 2004. ISBN 978-1-932382-32-7.
- Zafiris, Anna (3 February 2010). Original and Remake: “Dawn of the Dead” by George A. Romero (1978) and “Dawn of the Dead” by Zack Snyder (2004): Analysis. GRIN Verlag. ISBN 978-3-640-52695-6.
